Visitors to Saudi Arabia must obtain a visa unless they come from one of the visa exempt countries. Some visitors are eligible to obtain a visa online or on arrival while others needs to apply at one of the Saudi diplomatic missions in advance.

All visitors must hold a passport valid for six months.

Visa policy map

Freedom of movement 

Nationals of the following five countries do not require a visa to visit Saudi Arabia and may use national ID Cards to enter the country:

Visa exemption also applies to holders of diplomatic and official passports of France.

eVisa or Visa on arrival

Saudi Arabia started to issue tourist visas online and on arrival from 28 September 2019.

Holders of passports of the following 51 countries/territories can obtain eVisas online for a fee prior to arrival or on arrival to Saudi Arabia and these visas are valid to enter Saudi Arabia for 90 days:

On 2 January 2020, it was announced that holders of a US, UK or Schengen visa are eligible for a Saudi eVisa upon arrival, as long as the other visa is still valid and it has been used at least once to travel to the respective country/area.

It was reported that the Saudi eVisa website will be updated soon to reflect these changes.

This eligibility is only permissible through airlines based in Saudi Arabia, such as Saudia, Flynas and Flyadeal.

On September 1, 2022, a decree was announced allowing residents of GCC countries to apply for Saudi eVisas online and residents of the United States, United Kingdom and European Union may apply for a visa on arrival.

Admission refusal
Since the introduction of the e-visa program (September 2019), the Saudi Commission for Tourism and National Heritage claims on their website that having an Israeli stamp on the passport does not disqualify someone from visiting Saudi Arabia.

Saudi Arabia does issue special visas for some important Israeli business ventures (https://en.globes.co.il/en/article-israeli-passport-saudi-arabia-welcomes-you-1001413475)

Hajj visas 
A special visa category exists for pilgrims going to Saudi Arabia on the Hajj. Applications are encouraged to be done via licensed travel agents and are being accepted between 14th Shawwal and 25th Dhu al-Qadah.

Muslim female passengers arriving to perform Umrah or Hajj must either be accompanied by an immediate male family member such as a father, brother, husband, or son, who must be aged 18 years or older; or be over 45 years of age and travelling within a group of female passengers of the same age, who are accompanied by a group leader until their departure.

Development of tourist visas
In December 2013 Saudi Arabia announced its intention to begin issuing tourist visas for the first time in its history. Council of Ministers entrusted the Supreme Commission for Tourism and Antiquities with visa issuing on the basis of certain regulations approved by the Ministries of Interior and Foreign Affairs. A limited tourist visa programme was cancelled in March 2014. In December 2014 the Saudi Arabian authorities reiterated that tourist visas will not be reintroduced. However, in April 2016, former Crown Prince Muhammad bin Nayef announced that plans to start issuing tourist visas as part of Vision 2030, which aims to diversify Saudi economy and leading it away from an oil dependent economy. Saudi Arabia has welcomed Uber and Six Flags parks in its initial steps towards amplifying the tourism sector. In November 2017 it was announced that Saudi Arabia would begin issuing tourist visas and online application in 2018.

Non-Muslims (of whatever nationality) are not allowed to travel to the City of Mecca and the City Centre of Medina.

Full rules were expected to be published by the end of March 2018. In March 2018 the Saudi Commission for Tourism and National Heritage announced that the bylaws were ready for adoption and that they would be published by the end of the first quarter of 2018.

On September 25, 2018, the General Sports Authority announced the "Sharek International Events Visa" (SIEV), an electronic visa issued concurrently with the purchase of a ticket for qualifying special sporting events, concerts or cultural festivals through sharek.sa. The "Sharek" visa allows visitors to enter Saudi Arabia in order to attend the event and its validity ranges from a few days before and after the event itself. Applicants will be able to obtain single-entry, single-exit 30-day visas online for 640 riyals ($170.65) and enter from any port of entry. It was reported by the UAE news agency WAM that the Kingdom is set to open the eVisa system to general visitors holding passports from the United States, all Schengen (EU) countries, Australia, Japan, South Korea, South Africa, Brunei, Malaysia and Singapore with more countries to be added later.

On 2 March 2019, Saudi Arabia announced a new visa category that will be issued for foreign visitors to attend sport, entertainment and business events in the country.

On March 5, 2019, the Wall Street Journal reported, "Saudi officials plan to allow citizens of the U.S., much of Europe, Japan and China either visa-free access to the kingdom for tourism or a visa on arrival by the end of [2019]," according to people involved in the effort to introduce these visa reforms. "The effort is meant to make visiting Saudi Arabia about as easy as traveling to neighboring Arab tourist hot spots such as Dubai."

On September 27, 2019, Saudi Arabia introduced an e-visa program, allowing people from 49 countries to visit, by applying for a visa ahead of their trip or on arrival. Single entry visa allows a full month stay, while multiple entry visas allow to stay for up to three months. The visa cost 440 Saudi riyals ($117), including a health insurance fee. The tourists visiting the country will be obliged to follow the regulations that Saudi Arabia has mentioned on its travel website.

In October 2019, Saudi Arabia modified its policy for the tourists, and announced that it will allow foreign men and women to share hotel rooms without proving they are related. Saudi Commission for Tourism and National Heritage said that only Saudi nationals would be asked for family ID or proof of relationship on checking into hotels. Besides, all women, including Saudis, were permitted to book and stay in hotel alone by providing ID on check-in.

See also

 Visa requirements for Saudi citizens
 Saudi Arabian passport

References

External links 
Saudi Visitors and eVisa Portal
Visa requirements for the Hajj
Saudi eVisa for any nationality holding a Schengen, EU and US Visa
Citizens of 49 countries can apply for Saudi Tourist e-Visa
Umrah e-Visa Information

Saudi Arabia
Foreign relations of Saudi Arabia